Zsófia Szamosi (born 12 August 1977) is a Hungarian actress. Her film credits include Sing, Strangled and One Day. Szamosi was also a cast member in the television shows Terápia and The Curse.

On 29 November 2018 she won the award for Best Actress at the 40th Cairo International Film Festival for her role in One Day.

References

External links 
 

1977 births
21st-century Hungarian actresses
Hungarian film actresses
Hungarian television actresses
Living people